Kubu Island (Ga'nnyo) is a dry granite rock island located in the Makgadikgadi Pan area of Botswana. The island is located a few kilometers away from Orapa and Letlhakane mining towns and can be accessed through Mmatshumo in the Boteti district. The entire island is a national monument, and is considered a sacred site by the indigenous people of the area.

It is accessible by four wheel drive vehicles and has basic camping facilities. The campsite is run for the benefit of the local population. Top Gear presenter Jeremy Clarkson described the island as "just about the most astonishing place I've ever been" on the Botswana Special episode.

Natural history
The Makgadikgadi Pan is a large salt pan in northern Botswana, the largest salt flat complex in the world. These salt pans cover approximately 16,000 km2 and form the bed of the ancient Lake Makgadikgadi that began evaporating millennia ago.

Archaeological heritage
The name Kubu means either "large rock" in the Kalanga language or hippopotamus in Tswana. Local Khoe people call the site Ga'nnyo. Archaeological recovery in the Makgadikgadi has revealed the presence of prehistoric humans through abundant finds of stone tools; some of these tools have been dated sufficiently early to establish their origin as earlier than the era of Homo sapiens. Kubu Island also contains dry stone wall, which is up to 1.25 m high, and 344 circular stone cairns.

References
 C. Michael Hogan. 2008. Makgadikgadi, The Megalithic Portal, ed. A. Burnham 
 Kingsley Holgate. 2006. Africa. In the Footsteps of the Great Explorers. Struik publishers,  (restricted online version (google books))
 Kubu Island in Botswana Travel Guide 
 History of Kubu Island. 2009

Line notes

Islands of Botswana
Makgadikgadi Pan